Taū County is a county in the Manu'a District in American Samoa.

Demographics

Ta'u County was first recorded beginning with the 1912 special census. Regular decennial censuses were taken beginning in 1920. Its population zenith was in 1950, with 771 residents. It has since declined to its lowest point since the census began recording, just 358 residents. Manu'a District as a whole has similarly declined in population since that time.

Villages
Amouli, Ta'u County (now ghost) 
Luma
Si'ufaga

References 

 

Populated places in American Samoa